Time Bara Vait (Marathi: टाईम बरा वाईट) is a 2015 Indian Marathi-language film directed by Rahul Bhatankar under VRG Motion Pictures banner starring Bhushan Pradhan, Satish Rajwade, Nidhi Oza, Vishwajeet Pradhan. The movie  released on 19 June 2015. The film is a remake of Malayalam-Tamil Bilingual film Neram directed by Alphonse Putharen, starring Nivin Pauly, Nazriya Nazim and Bobby Simha.

Plot
The story revolves around the life of Rahul (Bhushan Pradhan), a computer engineer who lost his job. As he is jobless, he is also turned down by his girlfriend - Priya's father, who he was about to marry.

At the same time he is hounded by a loan shark- Bhai Raja (Satish Rajwade) from whom he borrowed money for his sister's marriage. At the present day he has a deadline to return money to the loan shark till 5 pm. His day turns upside down when he is robbed of money he got from his best friend to repay Bhai Raja.
Meanwhile, Priya decides to run away from her father and elope with Rahul. Suspecting on Rahul, Priya's father lodges a complaint against him in the nearby police station. So now Rahul is a fugitive from both, the law as well as Bhai Raja. Rahul is broke, confused and helpless and adding to his problems, he is also pressurized by his brother-in-law to give a hefty amount to start a business. Helpless and desperate Rahul wants to get out of the nightmare.

Will he be able to repay his loan and get the love of his life in the same day? Rahul has yet to experience a lot as the day is yet to be finished.

Cast
 Bhushan Pradhan as Rahul
 Satish Rajwade as Bhai Raja
 Nidhi Oza as Priya
 Bhalchandra Kadam as Auto wala
 Sanjay Mone as Priya's Father
 Hrishikesh Joshi as Sr. Inspector Vittu Popat
 Vishwajeet Pradhan as Big Bhai
 Anand Ingale
 Siddhant Bodake
 Nupur Dhudwadkar
 Rajesh Bhosale

Soundtrack

Rajesh Murugesan composed the soundtrack and film score of the original movie Neram. The soundtrack has been recreated for Time Bara Vait.

Track listing

Critical reception

Mihir Bhanage of The Times of India gave the film a rating of 3 out of 5 saying that, "The pace of the film is stunningly fast and keeps you on the edge of your seats. A drawback is the flashback sequences which at times the viewer is unable to link immediately."

References

External links
 
 
 

2015 films
Marathi remakes of Malayalam films
Marathi remakes of Tamil films
2010s Marathi-language films